Birchwood is a civil parish in the Borough of Warrington in Cheshire, England, and a suburb to the east of the town of Warrington.  It contains two buildings that are recorded in the National Heritage List for England as designated listed buildings, both of which are listed at Grade II.  This is the lowest of the three gradings given to listed buildings, applied to "buildings of national importance and special interest".  The parish is mainly residential, forming part of Warrington New Town.  Its listed buildings consist of a former farmhouse and a former barn.

References

Listed buildings in Warrington
Lists of listed buildings in Cheshire